José León Miracca  (born 23 September 1903, date of death unknown) was a Paraguayan football defender who played for Paraguay in the 1930 FIFA World Cup. He also played for Club Nacional.

References

External links

1903 births
Paraguayan footballers
Paraguay international footballers
Association football defenders
Club Nacional footballers
1930 FIFA World Cup players
Year of death missing